The Kararao are a tribe of the Kayapo nation of Brazil.  As of 2004, contacted Kararao numbered only 29 individuals and a further 50 or so remain uncontacted.  The Kararao live in the Terra Indigena Kararahô in Pará (Area-3308.37 km²).

References

External links
Molecular evidence of mother-to-child transmission of HTLV-IIc in the Kararao Village (Kayapo) in the Amazon Region of Brazil

Ethnic groups in Brazil
Uncontacted peoples
Kayapo people